Costco Wholesale Corporation (doing business as Costco Wholesale and also known simply as Costco) is an American multinational corporation which operates a chain of membership-only big-box retail stores (warehouse club). As of 2022, Costco is the fifth largest retailer in the world  and is the world's largest retailer of choice and prime beef, organic foods, rotisserie chicken, and wine . Costco is ranked #11 on the Fortune 500 rankings of the largest United States corporations by total revenue.

Costco's worldwide headquarters are in Issaquah, Washington, an eastern suburb of Seattle, although its Kirkland Signature house label bears the name of its former location in Kirkland. The company opened its first warehouse (the chain's term for its retail outlets) in Seattle  Through mergers, however, Costco's corporate history dates back to 1976, when its former competitor Price Club was founded in San Diego, California. , Costco has 848 warehouses worldwide: 584 in the United States, 107 in Canada, 40 in Mexico, 31 in Japan, 29 in the United Kingdom, 18 in Korea, 14 in Taiwan, 14 in Australia, four in Spain, two each in France and China, and one each in Iceland, New Zealand and Sweden.

History

Price Club

Costco opens
Jim Sinegal and Jeffrey H. Brotman opened the first Costco warehouse in Seattle on September 15, 1983. Sinegal had started in wholesale distribution by working for Sol Price at FedMart; Brotman, an attorney from an old Seattle retailing family, had also been involved in retail distribution from an early age. During this time, small businesses were given an 8% or 9% discount on inventories. He began his retail involvement as a grocery bagger. A second store opened in Portland in October, and a third in Spokane in  The company went public in 1985. The company was initially headquartered at its first warehouse in Seattle, but moved its headquarters to Kirkland in 1987.

The "PriceCostco" merger
In 1993, Costco and Price Club agreed to merge operations themselves after Price declined an offer from Walmart to merge Price Club with their warehouse store chain, Sam's Club. Costco's business model and size were similar to those of Price Club, which made the merger more natural for both companies. The combined company took the name PriceCostco, and memberships became universal, meaning that a Price Club member could use their membership to shop at Costco and vice versa. PriceCostco boasted 206 locations generating $16billion in annual sales. PriceCostco was initially led by executives from both companies, but in 1994, the Price brothers left the company to form PriceSmart, a warehouse club chain in Central America and the Caribbean unrelated to the current Costco.

In 1996, Costco moved its headquarters from Kirkland to Issaquah.

In 1997, Costco changed its name to Costco Wholesale Corporation, and all remaining Price Club locations were rebranded

Other company milestones

In 2005, Costco replaced its first Seattle warehouse with a new warehouse on an adjacent lot. The company was able to arrange to keep the same address for the new building. 

On April 26, 2012, CNBC premiered its documentary, The Costco Craze: Inside the Warehouse Giant.

In 2014, Costco was the third largest retailer in the United States. That year Costco announced plans to open an online store in China using Alibaba Group.

Costco announced the opening of 29 new locations in 2016, the most in one year since 2007. Span Construction, led by King Husein, has constructed almost all of Costco's buildings since 1989.

Costco opened its first warehouse in China on August 27, 2019, in Shanghai. The store's opening garnered much attention, which led to its opening day being cut short over safety concerns.

The first Costco in New Zealand was first opened at West Auckland in September 2022, delayed from mid-August due to the economic impact of the COVID-19 pandemic.

Costco today
In the United States, Costco's main competitors operating membership warehouses are Sam's Club (a subsidiary of Walmart) and BJ's Wholesale Club. Costco employs 304,000 full and part-time employees worldwide. In 2016, Costco had 86.7million members. This increased to 90.3million members in 2017. and 94.3million in 2018. In 2019, Costco had 98.5million members. In 2020, Costco had 105.5million members. In 2021, Costco had 111.6million members. , Costco has 118.9million members.

Costco was the first company to grow from zero to $3billion in sales in under six years. For the fiscal year ending on August 31, 2012, the company's sales totaled $97.062billion, with $1.709billion net profit. , Costco is ranked #14 on the Fortune 500 rankings of the largest United States corporations by total revenue. The ACSI (The American Customer Satisfaction Index) named Costco number one in the specialty retail store industry with a score of 84 in 2014.

From December 2013, Costco's board of directors was chaired by co-founder Jeffrey H. Brotman and included James Sinegal, co-founder and director, and two officers of the company: president/CEO W. Craig Jelinek and CFO Richard A. Galanti. On August 1, 2017, Jeffrey Brotman died. , James Sinegal and W. Craig Jelinek remained on the board. Jim Sinegal stepped down in 2018.

Locations

, Costco has 849 warehouses worldwide:
 584 in the United States
 107 in Canada
 40 in Mexico
 31 in Japan
 29 in the United Kingdom
 18 in Korea
 14 in Australia
 14 in Taiwan
 4 in Spain
 3 in China
 2 in France
 1 in Iceland
 1 in New Zealand
 1 in Sweden

International locations

Warehouses outside the U.S. are similar to the company's domestic locations, featuring generally identical layout, signage, and even parking lot markings. Food court menus are tailored to international tastes, with meat pies on offer in Australia; poutine in Canada and France; seafood-topped pizza in Asian locations; pastor taco-topped pizzas in Mexico; clam chowder in Japan, South Korea, and Taiwan; plokkfiskur in Iceland; and jacket potatoes in the UK. Additionally, Costco has led a strategic initiative to enhance the merchandise mix available at international warehouses by tailoring products to local tastes, offering a selection of both American and local products.

In Canada, it is a participant in the voluntary Scanner Price Accuracy Code managed by the Retail Council of Canada.

Largest and smallest locations
In 2005, the world's largest Costco by square feet was warehouse #692 in Hillsboro, Oregon.

In 2011, Costco's highest volume store was in Seoul, South Korea. In 2018, Taiwan's Taichung ranked at the top in the number of members and was second in the world in sales volume, behind South Korea's Yangjae store in Seoul. Of the 14 Costco operations in Taiwan, three – Taichung, Neihu, and Chungho – ranked in the top 10 in the world in sales volume.

, the smallest Costco is in Juneau, Alaska.

Costco Business Centers

Costco Business Centers are warehouses similar to regular Costco warehouses, and are open to all Costco members, regardless of membership type. Their merchandise caters predominantly to enterprises, with a focus on small businesses. Business Centers do not carry most consumer items like clothing, jewelry, media, and tires, while carrying larger quantities and more options for the business products they do carry. More than 70% of the items that can be acquired from a Costco Business Center cannot be found in a typical Costco store. Some locations do have a food court, a gas station, or both. Unlike regular warehouses, most Costco Business Centers have a Print & Copy Center which provides printing professional services. They have large parking spaces for trucks and are capable of delivering goods to businesses in bulk quantities, with a delivery charge of $25 for orders that are below $250. Costco Business Center operating hours are shorter than regular warehouses (usually opening at 7:00 am on Mondays to Saturdays and closed on Sundays), while discounts and coupons for Business Centers are issued separately from regular warehouses.

Locations
, there are 22 Costco Business Centers in the United States, located in Orlando, Florida; Texas (Stafford, and Dallas); Minneapolis, Minnesota; Phoenix, Arizona; California (Commerce, Hawthorne, Hayward, North Hollywood, Sacramento, San Diego, South San Francisco, Ontario, Westminster, San Marcos, and San Jose); Denver, Colorado; Morrow, Georgia; Bedford Park, Illinois; Hackensack, New Jersey; Las Vegas, Nevada; and Washington (Lynnwood, and Fife). A Business Center in San Marcos, California opened in March 2022.As of early 2023, Costco is renovating a former Sam's Club for a new Business Center in Anchorage, Alaska.

The first Costco Business Center outside the U.S. opened in Canada in Scarborough, Toronto in March 2017. In September 2020, the second Canadian Costco Business Centre opened in Saint-Hubert, Quebec, near Montreal. A third Canadian Business Centre opened in the Ottawa neighborhood of Gloucester in March 2021.

Finances 

For the fiscal year 2022, Costco reported earnings of US$5.844billion, with an annual revenue of $226.954billion.

Business model

Costco is a membership-only warehouse which generates a majority of its revenue from retail sales and a small percentage from membership fees. Customers must buy memberships to access the warehouse and make purchases. This is executed through the direct sourcing and efficient inventory management techniques.

Costco divides its business into three segments: United States Operations, Canadian Operations, and Other International Operations. These three business segments are reported by revenue and operating income. Of the three, the United States Operations was the largest, followed by Canadian Operations.

Sales model 
The company's rule is that no regular item may be marked up more than 14% over cost, and no Kirkland Signature item may be marked up more than 15% over cost. The company runs very lean, with overhead costs at about 10% of revenue and profit margins at 2%. Costco's annual membership fees (US$60/year for Gold Star, US$120/year for Executive ) account for 80% of Costco's gross margin and 70% of its operating income.

If Costco feels the wholesale price of any individual product is too high, they will refuse to stock the product. For example, in November 2009, Costco announced that it would stop selling Coca-Cola products, because the soft-drink maker refused to lower its wholesale prices. Costco resumed selling Coca-Cola products the following month.

Although the brand engages in visible efforts to reduce costs, the stores themselves are expensive. In 2013, Costco spent approximately $80million on each of the new stores it opened.

Lighting costs are reduced on sunny days, as most Costco locations have several skylights. During the day, electronic light meters measure how much light is coming in the skylights and turn off an appropriate percentage of the interior lights. During an average sunny day, it is normal for the center section of the warehouse not to have interior lights in use. The company has no public relations department and buys no outside advertising. A typical Costco warehouse carries only 3,700 distinct products, while a typical Walmart Supercenter carries approximately 140,000 products.

Like many other retailers vertically integrating their food supply chains, Costco has brought in-house poultry production for their rotisserie chickens, which are a major driver of customer traffic and sales. This is to allow keeping their pricing intact while maintaining a consistent quality control of its chickens as a result of annual growth of per-capita chicken consumption in the United States.

Costco is known for its "exit greeters", who briefly compare receipts against shopping cart contents as customers exit. They are trained to quickly count cart contents and serve as a form of customer service to verify that customers were charged correctly, have redeemed any voucher-based items (e.g., tickets), and have not missed items placed in their cart's lower racks. Costco has used exit greeters since its first store in 1983.

Online shopping
Costco primarily focuses on getting members to come in to a warehouse for purchases, instead of ordering products online. Due to the COVID-19 pandemic, Costco's online sales increased dramatically, with more online sales growth in 2020 than the previous 5 years combined.

The company opened its online shopping site at Costco.com on April 17, 2001.

Instacart offers Costco delivery in a select number of states including Arizona, California, Colorado, Florida, Georgia, Illinois, Indiana, Massachusetts, Maryland, Minnesota, Missouri, North Carolina, New Jersey, New York, Oregon, Tennessee, Texas, Virginia, Washington, and the District of Columbia.

Similarly, in March 2017, Costco initiated a partnership with Shipt, an online grocery delivery service. Unlike Instacart, Shipt charges its own membership fee, $99 a year or $14 a month, in exchange for free delivery on orders over $35. , Shipt offers Costco delivery in select Florida markets.

In October 2017, Costco launched same-day and two-day grocery delivery options for members.

Products
Costco has a frequently changing inventory and is known for carrying products for a time, then discontinuing them or using them as seasonal products. Over the years, Costco has gradually expanded its range of products and services. Initially, it preferred to sell only boxed products that could be dispensed by simply tearing the stretch wrap off a pallet. It now sells many other products that are more difficult to handle, such as art, books, caskets, clothing, computer software, fine wine, furniture, home appliances, home electronics, hot tubs, jewelry, perishable items (such as dairy, fresh baked goods, flowers, fresh produce, meat, seafood), solar panels, tires, and vacuum cleaners. Many warehouses also have gas stations, pharmacies, hearing aid centers, optometrists, eye and sunglass centers, photo processors, and tire garages.

Some locations have liquor stores kept separate from the main warehouse in order to comply with liquor license restrictions, while in some states alcohol is sold in the warehouse with the rest of the merchandise. In some states (such as Texas), the liquor store must be owned and operated by a separate company with separate employees. In 2006, Costco lost a lawsuit against the state of Washington in which it was seeking to purchase wine directly from the producer, bypassing the state retail monopoly. In Australia, Costco has to comply with regulations set by each state they choose to trade in; their first store in the Australian state of Victoria benefits from liberal-oriented alcohol licensing laws in that country, with retailers permitted to sell alcohol on shelves within the store in a manner similar to most European countries. In New Zealand, the country's sole warehouse in West Auckland cannot sell alcohol due to The Trusts' monopoly on liquor stores in the area.

Kirkland Signature

"Kirkland Signature" is Costco's private label brand, used for a variety of products sold at Costco's warehouses and website. Costco introduced Kirkland Signature in 1995, deriving the name from the location of Costco's then corporate headquarters, Kirkland, Washington. It accounts for almost a third of all Costco sales and is growing faster than Costco sales.

The idea for the private label was to provide the appearance of brand name quality products at discounted prices. To counteract the consumer confidence problem common in private labels, some of its products are co-branded with the name brands of their manufacturers, such as Chinet, Jelly Belly, Keurig Green Mountain, Ocean Spray, Stearns & Foster, and Starbucks. Some Kirkland Signature products still carry white-label brands but are otherwise manufactured by a partner, such as Duracell and Niagara Bottling.

Publications

Costco Connection
Costco Connection is a magazine sent free to the Costco executive members; it can also be accessed online by anyone, free of charge.

The magazine was established in 1987 as a newsprint publication and converted to a magazine in 1997. It features articles which regularly tie into the corporation along with business, celebrity features, cooking, entertaining, health, home improvement, and social articles, as well as coupons and ads. MediaPost reports: "While about 90% of the magazine's advertising is co-op, increasingly national advertisers such as Procter & Gamble are buying space, notes Roeglin -- presumably because of the pub's gargantuan reach and the data it has on its subscribers (whose average household income is $156,000 a year). 'We see about 56% of our subscribers a month buy something at one of our stores based on something they've read in the magazine,' says Roeglin." The magazine is one of the largest-circulation print monthlies in the United States and is the third in circulation figures in the United States after AARP The Magazine and AARP Bulletin.

Services

Concierge service
Costco offers a free "concierge" service to members who purchase electronics, to help answer questions regarding setup and use and avoid potential returns due to not understanding how to use the products.

Costco Auto and Home Insurance
Costco has an agreement with CONNECT, powered by American Family Insurance, for auto insurance, home insurance and umbrella insurance.

Costco Optical
Costco Optical ranks as the fifth-largest optical company in the US, . Optometrists working at Costco locations will see patients without Costco memberships, although a membership is required to fill a prescription at the optical department.

Costco Travel
Costco Travel is a wholly owned subsidiary of Costco Wholesale and offers leisure travel to Costco members of the United States and Canada.

The program offers vacation packages to the Caribbean, Europe, Florida, Hawaii, Las Vegas, Mexico, and the South Pacific.

Food service

In 1985, Costco started to sell freshly prepared food through a hot dog cart at its original Seattle warehouse. Most Costco locations now have a food court. They can be indoors or outdoors, but the menu is essentially the same: hot dog with drink (one of the most popular items), pizza, frozen yogurt/ice cream, Pepsico beverages, baked items, and sandwiches. Some US locations also offer Polish sausage or bratwurst in addition to hot dogs, at the same $1.50 price. In Australia and New Zealand, the hot dog is made of pork and is sold with a large soda for $1.99 (AUD/NZD). In Canada, the price for a hot dog and soda with refills is C$1.50. In Mexico, the hot dog is made of 100% beef and includes a drink (with refills) for MXN$35. In the UK, the hot dog is also made from beef and customers also get a drink (with refills) for £1.50. Costco sold more than 137million quarter-pound (113 g) hot dogs in its food courts in 2017. In Taiwan and Japan, the hot dog is made of pork as well. Japan's price for their 120-gram hot dog & refillable 600-ml drink is ¥180.

As of June 2022, cheese or pepperoni pizza (along with pre-ordering of full pizzas to take home), chicken bakes, ice cream (vanilla), ice cream sundae (vanilla, with very berry or chocolate sauce toppings), fruit smoothies, latte freeze (without chocolate), mocha freeze (with chocolate), and twisted churros (in select stores) are offered at all United States locations. Some food court items are only available in certain countries. For example, the bulgogi bake and mango boba tea are only available in Australia, Taiwan, Korea, and Japan; poutine is available in Canada and France. There are, however, temporary menu items available exclusively in several countries, like the pastor taco-topped pizzas in Mexico.

Due to slow sales, in 2009, the pretzel was replaced by the churro. In April 2013, Pepsi replaced all Coca-Cola fountain drinks at U.S. locations because Coke had raised its prices; this helped keep the hot dog combo with soda at its original  price.

In select Costco food courts, Costco was selling cheeseburgers for a limited time to experiment sales. The cheeseburger was not successful, and never spread to more than a few locations.

Costco credit card

On April 1, 2016, in US, Citigroup became the exclusive issuer of Costco's branded credit cards. Prior to that, Costco credit cards had been issued by American Express since 2001, and Costco accepted only American Express cards for credit transactions. After the switch of its co-branded cards to Citi, Costco ceased accepting AmEx and began exclusively accepting Visa. AmEx cited the reason for the split that Costco was asking for lower transaction fees than AmEx was willing to grant. In Canada, Costco ended its AmEx relationship in 2014, and starting in 2015, it partnered with Capital One Mastercard for branded credit cards. In 2020, Capital One announced it would be ending the partnership in late 2021. It was announced that beginning in March 2022, Costco will begin a partnership with CIBC Mastercard. Costco branded credit cards from both issuers also serve as alternate Costco membership cards, with a customized reverse side containing membership info.

Costco Audiobook App 
In March 2021, Costco started selling audiobooks and launched a corresponding iOS and Android app to listen to purchases. The app is free, however the books are exclusive to Costco members. The retailer sells audiobooks in bundles grouped by genre or author, with prices ranging from $5 to $50. Audiobooks are currently only available at U.S. locations.

Labor relations

Employee rights 

While some former Price Club locations in California and the northeastern United States are staffed by Teamsters, the majority of Costco locations are not unionized, although there was a drive in 2012 to unionize some locations in Canada. The Teamsters claim that over 15,000 Costco employees are union members. The non-union locations have revisions to their Costco Employee Agreement every three years concurrent with union contract ratifications in locations with collective bargaining agreements. The Employee Agreement sets forth such things as benefits, wages, disciplinary procedures, paid holidays, bonuses, and seniority. The Employee Agreement is subject to change by Costco at any time and offers no absolute protection to the workers. As of June 2022, non-supervisory hourly wages ranged from $17.50 to $28.45 in the U.S., $16.00 to $28.70 in Canada, and £9.75 to £13.90 in the United Kingdom. Health benefits include coverage through Aetna, remote primary care through Teladoc, second opinions and clinical navigation by Grand Rounds, varieties of health insurance agencies with Custom Benefit Consultants Inc. (CBC), and wellness coaching by Omada.

In February 2021, Costco announced that it would be raising the starting rate for its hourly store workers in the United States to $16 an hour. Costco has been actively raising their minimum wage starting with $14 during 2018, and into $15 during 2019. They further add that 20% of their hourly employees will be subject to the minimum wage change.

Contractors 
Product-demonstration (e.g., food samples) employees work for an independent company. In the western U.S., the company is called Warehouse Demo Services, Kirkland, Washington. Costco also uses Club Demonstration Services (CDS), based in San Diego, California. Demonstration employees receive a pay and benefit package that is less than that of Costco employees. , demonstrations/samples are provided by CDS in Canada.

Public health 
Following the COVID-19 outbreak, the first Costco store in Perth, Australia, unexpectedly opened on March 19, 2020, without an opening ceremony and earlier than its planned time of 8:00AM due to high demand, especially for toilet paper products, to ease panic buying in mainstream supermarkets in Australia, although toilet paper was limited to only one per transaction. Carts and other objects were cleaned regularly to minimize the risk of contracting the virus.

Costco contractor CDS temporarily stopped providing free food samples March 6, 2020 at Costco stores globally amid public health concerns regarding COVID-19.

On December 23, 2020, a Costco store in Cuernavaca, Morelos, Mexico, was forced to temporarily close after the store ignored restrictions on store capacity.

Discontinued concepts

Costco Home
The first Costco Home warehouse opened in 2002, in Kirkland, Washington. The warehouse's concept was to combine the value, setting and members-only elements of Costco's warehouse clubs with the product array one would find at an upscale home store, such as Fortunoff or Crate & Barrel. The Costco Home warehouses sold furniture, housewares, kitchen products and accessories from higher-end brands such as Lexington, Ralph Lauren and Waterford in a warehouse-club setting. A second warehouse opened in 2004 in Tempe, Arizona.

On April 2, 2009, the company announced that it would be abandoning its Costco Home concept, closing the two existing stores in Kirkland, Washington and Tempe, Arizona on July 3, 2009, and abandoning plans for a third warehouse in Portland, Oregon.

Controversies
In 2010, Mercy for Animals conducted an undercover investigation at Buckeye Veal Farm, a veal supplier to Costco. Immediately following the investigative release, Costco adopted a policy against purchasing veal from producers that use the crate-and-chain production method. The case prompted Ohio lawmakers to vote in favor of a veal crate phase-out in the state.

In 2012, Mercy for Animals conducted another undercover investigation of a pork supplier to major retailers such as Costco, Walmart, Safeway, Kroger, and Kmart. Before the public release of the investigation, Costco announced they would begin requiring their pork suppliers to phase out gestation crates.

In 2014, The Guardian reported that Costco is a client of Charoen Pokphand Foods. Over six months, The Guardian traced down a supply chain from slave ships in Asian waters to leading producers and retailers. Costco has published a statement saying it has had a supplier code of conduct since 1999 which does not allow this practice, and that independent auditors check for violations regularly.

In 2015, The Humane Society of the United States conducted an undercover investigation at an egg supplier to Costco. An undercover worker at Hillandale Farms, a major egg supplier to Costco, filmed conditions in which egg-laying hens lived in tiny, wire cages. Following the investigations, several celebrities including Brad Pitt and Ryan Gosling publicly wrote to Costco to address this issue. Following efforts by animal protection nonprofits including The Humane League, Costco released an updated commitment to source exclusively cage-free eggs in its operations.

In 2016, a follow up to Costco's shift to cage-free eggs by animal rights group Direct Action Everywhere (DxE) reported cannibalism and high mortality at a cage-free Costco egg supplier. Costco denied the allegations, but the video sparked a discussion about animal welfare problems continuing to exist at cage-free egg farms. Writing in The Huffington Post, DxE co-founder Wayne Hsiung argued that the new investigation, rather than suggesting that Costco should keep birds in cages, indicated that hens should have the right not to be raised for food or kept on farms at all.

In January 2017, Costco was brought to court in the US for lax pharmacy controls by violation of the Controlled Substances Act. Allegations such as Costco "filling prescriptions that were incomplete", or were for substances "beyond various doctors' scope of practice". The case was settled after Costco paid .

In August 2017, a federal judge ordered a "deceptive" Costco to pay Tiffany & Co. $19.4million for misleading consumers into thinking they could buy legitimate Tiffany merchandise at warehouse club prices.

Costco was criticized in 2019 by the Natural Resources Defense Council and SumOfUs for using virgin Canadian boreal forest to make its toilet paper. NRDC says that over the previous twenty years, 28 million acres of Canadian boreal forest had been cut down to make toilet paper.

In September 2020, CBS News reported that Costco has stopped selling Palmetto Cheese after the owner of the pimento cheese brand called Black Lives Matter a "terror organization." Costco posted a note to the item in their Myrtle Beach location indicating that the item will not be reordered, and over 120 Costco's throughout the US will no longer be carrying the item.

In October 2020, Costco dropped Chaokoh coconut milk over the allegations of forced monkey labor. PETA accused the manufacturer, Theppadungporn Coconut Co., of using forced monkey labor, finding cruelty to monkeys at their farms and facilities. Ken Kimble, Costco's Vice President of Corporate Food and Sundries, stated Costco has launched an investigation regarding the issue and have ceased purchasing from the supplier/owner of the brand Chaokoh condemning the use of monkey labor. Kimble also stated that Costco will continue to monitor the implementation of the harvest policies and once satisfied will resume purchasing.

In December 2020, Costco announced plans to end the use of eggs from caged chickens throughout its operations worldwide. It became the first US retailer to issue a global policy on the confinement of animals in its supply chain. Josh Dahmen, Costco financial planning and investor relations director also said that "We are in the process of making that transition to cage-free eggs. We will continue to increase the percentage over time, with a goal of eventually getting to 100%."

See also

 Bulk foods
 Costco bear
 Costco Wholesale Corp. v. Omega, S. A.
 Retail
 Wholesaling
 Price Club

References

External links

 
 Official UK website
 Why every Costco product is called 'Kirkland Signature'? - CNN

 
1983 establishments in Washington (state)
Companies based in King County, Washington
Discount stores of the United States
Online retailers of the United States
Organizations based in Issaquah, Washington
American companies established in 1983
Retail companies established in 1983
Supermarkets of the United States